Daniela Dumitrascu (born July 26, 1968) is a Romanian sport shooter. She competed at the 1992 Summer Olympics in the women's 25 metre pistol event, in which she tied for 14th place, and the women's 10 metre air pistol event, in which she placed seventh.

References

1968 births
Living people
ISSF pistol shooters
Romanian female sport shooters
Shooters at the 1992 Summer Olympics
Olympic shooters of Romania